Ferran Martínez Garriga (born 25 April 1968) is a retired Spanish professional basketball player. At a height of 2.13 m (7'0") tall, he played as the power forward and center positions.

Professional career
During his pro club career, Martínez won the EuroLeague championship in 1994, and he was the top scorer of the finals. He also won the FIBA Intercontinental Cup championship in 1996.

National team career
Martínez played in 156 games with the senior Spain men's national basketball team, at the following tournaments: the 1987 EuroBasket, the 1988 Summer Olympics, the 1989 EuroBasket, the 1990 FIBA World Championship, the 1993 EuroBasket, the 1994 FIBA World Championship, the 1995 EuroBasket, and the 1997 EuroBasket.

Awards and accomplishments

Catalonia
 Lliga Catalana (Catalan League) (6): (1985–86, 1989–90, 1990–91, 1991–92, 1992–93, 1995–96)

Spain
 Liga ACB (Spanish League) (7): 1986–87, 1987–88, 1989–90, 1990–91, 1991–92, 1994–95, 1995–96
 Copa del Rey (Spanish King's Cup) (2): 1986–87, 1987–88
 Copa Príncipe de Asturias ACB (Spanish Prince of Asturias' Cup) (2): 1987–88, 1990–91

Greece
 Greek Basket League (1): 1997–98

Europe
 FIBA Saporta Cup (1): 1985–86
 FIBA European Super Cup (1): 1986
 FIBA Korać Cup (1): 1986–87
 EuroLeague (1): 1993–94

World
 FIBA Intercontinental Cup (1): 1996

References

External links
FIBA Profile
FIBA Europe Profile
Eurobasket.com Profile
Spanish League Profile  
Italian League Profile 

1968 births
Living people
Basketball players at the 1988 Summer Olympics
Centers (basketball)
Olympic basketball players of Spain
FC Barcelona Bàsquet players
Joventut Badalona players
Liga ACB players
Panathinaikos B.C. players
Peristeri B.C. players
Power forwards (basketball)
RCD Espanyol Bàsquet players
Spanish men's basketball players
1990 FIBA World Championship players
Basketball players from Barcelona
1994 FIBA World Championship players